Luděk Stracený (born 19 April 1977, in Prague) is a Czech former professional football player.

External links
 
 
 

1977 births
Living people
Czech footballers
Czech Republic youth international footballers
Czech Republic under-21 international footballers
Czech Republic international footballers
Olympic footballers of the Czech Republic
Czech First League players
AC Sparta Prague players
FK Viktoria Žižkov players
Czech expatriate footballers
Expatriate footballers in Scotland
Scottish Premier League players
Heart of Midlothian F.C. players
Association football forwards
Footballers from Prague